The year 1815 in architecture involved some significant events.

Events
 September 10–24 – The Champion (London) publishes "The Present Low State of the Arts in England and more particularly of Architecture", primarily a personal attack on John Soane written anonymously by his son George.
 The great tithe barn at Cholsey in England, the world's largest when built around 1300, is dismantled.

Buildings and structures

Buildings

 St. Patrick's Old Cathedral in New York City, designed by Joseph-François Mangin, is dedicated.
 Church of St. Paul's Radcliffeboro (Charleston, South Carolina) is completed.
 St. John's Church, Philadelphia, designed by William Strickland, is built.
 St Michael's Church, Aigburth, England, designed by ironfounder John Cragg with Thomas Rickman, is consecrated.
 Kuopio Cathedral in Finland is completed.
 The Royal Pavilion (Brighton Pavilion) is redesigned to become a royal residence located in Brighton, England.
 Armadale Castle on Skye (Scotland) is built in the style of Scottish Baronial architecture to the design of James Gillespie Graham.
 The Nelson Monument, Edinburgh, on Calton Hill, designed by Robert Burn, is dedicated.
 Dunans and Ferness Bridges in Scotland, designed by Thomas Telford, are completed.
 Waterloo Bridge, Betws-y-Coed, Wales, designed by Thomas Telford, is constructed.
 Glenfinnan Monument in Scotland, designed by James Gillespie Graham, is erected.
 Carneal House is built at 405 East Second Street in Covington, Kentucky.

Awards
 Grand Prix de Rome, architecture: Pierre Anne Dedreux.

Births
 January 11 – David Stevenson, Scottish lighthouse engineer (d. 1886)
 March 7 – Samuel Sloan, American architect working in Philadelphia (d. 1884)
 October 30 – Andrew Jackson Downing, American landscape architect (d. 1852)
 December 23 – Ildefons Cerdà, Catalan Spanish urban planner (d. 1876)
 William Harrison Folsom, American Mormon architect (d. 1901)
 John M. Trimble, American theater architect (d. 1867)

Deaths
 June 5 – Robert Burn, Scottish architect (b. 1752)
 November 15 – Louis Michel Thibault, French-born architect working in South Africa (b. 1750)

References

Architecture
Years in architecture
19th-century architecture